Belawadi Mallamma (ಬೆಳವಡಿ ಮಲ್ಲಮ್ಮ) was a queen of Belawadi kingdom (samshtana). She is credited with being the first queen in history who built and trained a women's army.

Biography 
She was the daughter of King Madhulinga Nayaka, of the Sodhe Kingdom, which controlled modern-day Uttara Kannada district and south Goa.

Education 
Mallamma's education began at 5, where she attended a school built by her father for her and her brother, Sadashiva Nayaka. The school's principal was Shankar Bhat, a notable scholar, and 10 senior shastris (respected teachers of philosophy and of ancient texts) acted as Mallamma's teachers.

When Mallamma attained marriageable age, her father chose to arrange for swayamvara (whereby the girl would choosing her husband from among the courters). Mallamma decided to challenge her suitors to hunt the number of tigers equal to his age plus one, within one month. 

Prince of Belawadi, Ishaprabhu, at 20 years of age, successfully hunted and killed 21 tigers in a month, earning the hand of Mallamma. With this union, Mallamma became known as Belawadi Mallamma and, along with Ishaprabhu, would later become the ruling couple of Belawadi, a relatively small kingdom whose territories covered parts of modern-day Belagavi and Dharwad districts.

There was no conflict between shivaji maharaj and malamma
As mentioned in The book Turukari panchamara itihasa written by Shiva basava shastri of Brahanmatha (heritage site of Belavadi Sansthana). History of Belawadi Sansthana starts from 1511 with king Chandrashekhara raja and it mentions about war between Shivaji and Mallamma. Ishaprabhu died in the battlefield later Mallamma fought with ShivajiRaje and she defeated the Shivaji. As result of battle hero stone is installed in their Samshtana. The book  Turukari panchamara itihasa was published first time in 1929.

Marathi works jede shakavari , Chitragupta bakhar , 91 Kalami bakhar mentioned about battle between Shivaji and Mallamma. Shiva vamsha sudharnava is Sanskrit book written by mallamma's teacher Shankara bhattaru . The book says Shivaji was fought with Belawadi Mallamma . Tarabai second daughter-in-law of Shivaji gave first prize for this book and mentioning that the book contains exact subject of Shivaji and Mallamma. Second prize for Balasaheb bhaves Shivaji charitra and third prize for the book written by Shesho Shinivas Muthalika. Scholar Shesho Srinivas Muthalik recorded the life in the palace of Madhulinga Nayaka in 1704-5 A.D. in the Marathi language.

In Jadunath Sarkar's biography of Shivaji in Marathi language, he mentioned Mallamma as Savitribai and 27 days war held between ShivajiRaje and Mallamma.

A contemporary British work says He ShivajiRaje is At present besieging a fort where.. he has suffered more disgrace than even he did from all power of the moghul of the deccan (Bijapuri) and he who hath conquered so many kingdoms is not able to reduce this woman Desai [Factory records, Surat,107].

Yadavada stone is a symbol about compromise between Shivaji and Mallamma.

References

Bibliography

Indian military leaders
History of Karnataka
17th-century women rulers
Indian women in war
Hindu monarchs
Kannada people
Lingayatism
People from Belgaum
Women in 17th-century warfare
17th-century Indian women
17th-century Indian people
Indian female royalty